Robert E. Whelan is a retired Justice of the Supreme Court of New York 8th Judicial District as well as the former Comptroller of Buffalo, New York from 1976 to 1989.

Early life
Whelan was born in Buffalo, New York and was the seventh of ten children. His father, Robert J. Whelan, was a Buffalo policeman who attained the rank of Assistant Chief of Detectives. His mother, Margaret Whelan (née Southard), was a stay-at-home mother who raised ten children. His great-grandfather, James Whelan, who came from Ireland, was a Buffalo attorney who worked in the same law firm as Grover Cleveland. Whelan attended Canisius College for his bachelor's degree, graduating with honors, before he attended the University of Buffalo for his Juris Doctor.

Public life and career
Whelan, at 32, was the youngest ever elected as Buffalo's Chief Fiscal officer, where he served for an unprecedented four terms; something no one before or since has done. During Whelan's four terms in office as Comptroller, he led the efforts and oversaw their storing of Buffalo's fiscal integrity after inheriting a $35 million deficit that caused the city to lose its credit rating. He restored and improved the city's credit rating, and achieved fourteen consecutive years of city financial results ending in the black. He also introduced innovative financial and data processing mechanisms in the early 1980s. He was the first to secure negotiated bond legislation from the governor and state legislature; the first in the nation to do so. The Buffalo Water Authority's financing technique was made a reality due to his efforts. During his tenure, he negotiated and sold close to $1 billion in the city of Buffalo's long and short term borrowing. Whelan successfully achieved bond sales for the Buffalo Sewer Authority in excess of $300 million.

Tim Russert
One of many of Whelan's career successes was of his former "protege", NBC's Meet the Press, Tim Russert. Whelan befriended Russert when the Buffalo native had just returned to Buffalo in 1972 after he graduated from John Carroll University. At Whelan's initiative, Russert was hired in the office, of then, City Comptroller; George D. O'Connell. During Russert's law school years, Whelan secured summer employment for him. In 1977, Russert was hired as the first Buffalo Office Manager for Senator Daniel Patrick Moynihan at Whelan's recommendation. As Western New York's coordinator of Moynihan's first campaign, Whelan saw to it that Russert was closely involved in the inner-workings of the campaign. From there Russert moved on his own to his successes with Governor Mario Cuomo, NBC News, and later as host of NBC's "Meet the Press". They remained close friends until Russert's death in 2008.

Awards and honors
 Nationally recognized as Comptroller to "All-Pro City Management Team", City and State Magazine for two consecutive years (1986-1987). This award focusing on the talents of public officials across the country, was determined by investment officers who are proficient in municipal finance and management. This distinction was bestowed upon Whelan first in 1986 and again in 1987 as he was selected to repeat on the All-Pro City Management Team- the only elected public official in the nation to receive such an honor.  
 Outstanding Financial Manager Award 1987 from the American Institute of CPAs, Cleveland Chapter     
 Justice of the Year 1991 from Matrimonial & Family Law Committee of Erie County Bar Association

Professional affiliations
 Former President 8th District, New York State Supreme Court Justice's Association 
 State Executive Committee Member, New York State Supreme Court Justice's Association
 Member, American Bar Association and NYS Bar Associates Judicial Administration Division
 Member, National Conference of State Trial Judges of the American Bar Association
 Former Board of Directors member, State University of New York at Buffalo Law School Alumni Association

Philanthropy
 Chairman, Arthritis Foundation Telethon (1984-1985)
 Chairman, National March of Dimes Telethon and Annual Fund Drive
 United Way Loaned Executive, Buffalo United Way (1967–70)
 Chairman, Buffalo & Erie County Convention Center (1980)
 Former Board Member, Fine Arts Academy Albright–Knox Art Gallery (1975-1989; Ex Officio)
 Chairman, United Negro College Fund Telethon (1988)
 Organized 1st Fundraising golf tournament for the United Negro College Fund (1988)

References

External links

 

New York Supreme Court Justices
Comptrollers of Buffalo, New York
New York (state) Democrats
Living people
Year of birth missing (living people)
University at Buffalo Law School alumni